This is a list of nations, as represented by National Olympic Committees (NOCs), that have participated in the Winter Olympic Games between 2012 and 2016. The Winter Youth Olympic Games have been held every four years since 2012. 71 NOCs (110 of the current 206 NOCs) have participated in at least one Winter Games, and Seventy nations in all two Winter Youth Olympic Games date.

List of nations

Table legend

Alphabetical list

Nations that have never competed
117 of the 206 active NOCs have yet to compete in a Winter Youth Olympics.

See also
List of participating nations at the Summer Youth Olympic Games